Yannick Denis Bisson (born May 16, 1969) is a Canadian film and television actor and director best known to international audiences for playing Detective William Murdoch on the series Murdoch Mysteries.

Early life
Bisson was born in Montreal, Quebec, and is of French and English ancestry. He moved to Toronto, Ontario, as a teenager and his acting career began when he was still in high school. His father, noting his son's interest in acting, encouraged him to reply to a newspaper advertisement seeking "child actors".

Career
Bisson's first major role was in the 1984 CBC movie of the week Hockey Night, alongside Megan Follows and Rick Moranis. He starred in the Canadian television series Learning the Ropes from 1988 through 1989. From 1994 through 1997, he starred in the syndicated action series High Tide, co-starring Rick Springfield. He moved back from Los Angeles to Vancouver, British Columbia in 1998 when he was cast as the lead in CBC'S Nothing Too Good for a Cowboy. From 2000 though 2004, he had a recurring role as attorney Brian Tedrow on the Showtime drama Soul Food.

He starred as FBI agent Jack Hudson in the PAX TV series Sue Thomas: F.B.Eye and in the short-lived CBC drama Nothing Too Good for a Cowboy.

He appeared on Falcon Beach in season two as well as in several Lifetime cable movies, such as Crazy for Christmas and I do (but I don't), and the Disney Channel movie Genius. Bisson was a guest star on Flashpoint and starred in the television movies Brothers by Choice and Keshan. He appeared as Jon in all of the Roxy Hunter movies to date. Bisson is featured in a series of commercials for CIBC. He starred in the 2001 TV movie Loves Music, Loves to Dance based on the book by Mary Higgins Clark. He provided the voice of Ferdie in the children's animated series Maxie's World.

Bisson plays the lead in the CBC Television drama series Murdoch Mysteries and made his directorial debut with the show's fourth-season episode "Buffalo Shuffle".

Starting on December 30, 2013, Bisson starred as a preschool teacher in The Adventures of Napkin Man on CBC Television.

Bisson was awarded the Fan's Choice Award at the 2016 Canadian Screen Awards on March 13, 2016. Murdoch Mysteries has been awarded several Canadian Screen Award Golden Screen Awards in 2017, 2018 and 2020.

Bisson played as Martin Bartell, in Hallmark Channel's Aurora Teagarden Mysteries. He is introduced in "Three Bedrooms, One Corpse" as a CIA agent Keshan who moves to town, falls in love with Teagarden, and later dates her. Bisson left the series in 2018.

Bisson received the ACTRA Toronto Award of Excellence in 2017 for his lifetime of work.

Bisson was the host of Discovery Canada Channel's Star Racer reality show.

Personal life
Bisson is married to Chantal Craig, a former fitness instructor who currently works as a television content creator and writer.

The couple met in high school and married in 1990. They have three daughters: Brianna, Dominique and Mikaela. Craig made guest appearances on two of Bisson's television series, Sue Thomas: F.B.Eye and Murdoch Mysteries. Their daughter played "Penny Renton" in an episode of Murdoch Mysteries entitled "Love and Human Remains." Dominique Bisson had a part as Gloria Abercrombie in an episode of Murdoch Mysteries, season 2, entitled "Snakes and Ladders". Craig is now known as Shantelle Bisson, a producer, author, parenting expert and regular contributor to Zoomer Magazine. She is the owner of Shantilly's Place, a marina in Kawartha Lakes, Ontario. 

Yannick Bisson is also an avid bicyclist and bicycle collector. He formerly worked as a builder between acting jobs to support his family.

Filmography

Film

Television

References

External links

 
 

1969 births
Living people
20th-century Canadian male actors
21st-century Canadian male actors
Canadian male child actors
Canadian male film actors
Canadian male television actors
Canadian male voice actors
Canadian people of English descent
Canadian people of French descent
French Quebecers
Male actors from Montreal